Campocraspedon is a genus of ichneumonid wasp in the insect order Hymenoptera. It comprises six species.

The species included in this genus are:

 Campocraspedon annulitarsis
 Campocraspedon caudatus
 Campocraspedon elongatus
 Campocraspedon foutsi
 Campocraspedon satoi
 Campocraspedon truncatus

References 

Diplazontinae
Ichneumonidae genera